Symplocos pyriflora is a species of plant in the family Symplocaceae. It is endemic to Peninsular Malaysia.

References

pyriflora
Endemic flora of Peninsular Malaysia
Conservation dependent plants
Taxonomy articles created by Polbot